WBLW (88.1 FM) is a radio station broadcasting a religious format. Licensed to Gaylord, Michigan, it first began broadcasting in 2000.

Sources 
Michiguide.com - WBLW History

External links
 

BLW
Radio stations established in 2000